The Goal Rush was a live ITV television programme that aired from 2001 to 2003, produced by Granada Television. The programme was broadcast on Saturdays as a rival show to Final Score on BBC One, and provided live football scores from the Premier League and The Football League. Coverage began on ITV2 and then continued on ITV1. The programme was presented by Angus Scott.

ITV ran the programme during the two of the three seasons that it held the rights to show Premier League highlights. After the rights were lost, The Goal Rush was axed.

Format
The Goal Rush was announced in 2000 by Brian Barwick, ITV Controller of Sport. The programme was a replacement for Football First which had aired exclusively on ITV2 since its launch in late 1998. It was described as "having the style and feel of the Bloomberg Television channel". It first aired on 18 August 2001 after ITV won the rights to Premier League highlights. The format was similar to that which is used by the BBC's Score and Sky's Soccer Saturday; with live match reports, on screen scores and a ticker.

Each episode started at 14:30 on Saturdays on ITV's digital channel, ITV2. At varying times after 16:00 the coverage would switch to ITV1. The service was hosted by presenter Angus Scott, and former footballer and football manager Ron Atkinson provided expert analysis. Other analysts included Clive Allen, Paul Elliott, Jim Beglin and John Barnes.

Reception
The look of the service resembled the BBC's service quite closely and commentators criticised ITV for this. The programme never achieved a high number of viewers and on 6 April 2002 the show received ITV's lowest ever audience share with 3%, during the broadcast of the 2002 Grand National on BBC One.

References

External links 
 

2001 British television series debuts
2003 British television series endings
2000s British sports television series
ITV Sport
ITV (TV network) original programming
Premier League on television
English Football League on television
Television series by ITV Studios
Television shows produced by Granada Television
English-language television shows